El Ponton Airport is located in La Vega Province, Dominican Republic and serves to general and private aviation.
It can receive only bimotor aircraft because of it runway length.

Sources

Airports in the Dominican Republic
Buildings and structures in La Vega Province